Guglielmo Logoteta (died 1449) was a Roman Catholic prelate who served as Archbishop of Reggio Calabria (1440–1449).

Biography
On 18 May 1440, Guglielmo Logoteta was appointed during the papacy of Pope Eugene IV as Archbishop of Reggio Calabria.
He served as Archbishop of Reggio Calabria until his death in 1449.

While bishop, he was the principal consecrator of John Drene, Bishop of Caithness (1447).

References

External links and additional sources
 (for Chronology of Bishops) 
 (for Chronology of Bishops) 

15th-century Roman Catholic archbishops in the Kingdom of Naples
Bishops appointed by Pope Eugene IV
1449 deaths